The Viceroy of Shaan-Gan was one of eight regional viceroys in the Qing dynasty. The Viceroy of Shaan-Gan had jurisdiction over Shaanxi and Gansu provinces as well as western Inner Mongolia.

Name 
The name Shaan-Gan is derived by taking the first characters of the province names Shaanxi and Gansu.

In Chinese its full name is the Governor-General of Shaanxi and Gansu Provinces and the Surrounding Areas; Overseeing Military Affairs and Food Production, Manager of Waterways, Director of Civil Affairs.

History

Ming dynasty
The office of Viceroy of Shaan-Gan originated in the early Ming dynasty with the garrisoning of military forces in three towns along the northern border of Shaanxi Province. The three garrisons were called "Xunfu of Yansui" (延綏巡撫), "Xunfu of Ningxia" (寧夏巡撫) and "Xunfu of Gansu" (甘肅巡撫), respectively.

In 1497, when the Mongols of the Northern Yuan dynasty made intrusions across the border, the Hongzhi Emperor put Wang Yue (王越) in charge of coordinating military actions in Shaanxi, Yansui, Ningxia and Gansu.

In the early reign of the Zhengde Emperor (r. 1505–1521), the Mongols invaded Guyuan. The general Cao Xiong (曹雄) rejected external help from reinforcements. Yang Yiqing (楊一清) led lightly armed cavalry to launch a surprise attack on the Mongols and succeeded in driving them back. After this incident, Yang Yiqing realized that military operations in Yansui, Ningxia and Gansu had to be better coordinated, hence he urged the imperial court to appoint a viceroy to oversee the three areas. Liu Daxia (劉大夏) nominated Yang Yiqing for that position.

The office of the viceroy was created in 1525, during the reign of the Jiajing Emperor, under the name "tidu of military affairs" (提督軍務). The office was renamed to "zongzhi" (總制) in 1528, and to "zongdu" (總督) in 1540. The headquarters were located at Huamachi (花馬池; present-day Yanchi County, Ningxia).

Qing dynasty
The office was recreated in 1645, during the reign of the Shunzhi Emperor, as "Viceroy of the Three Borders in Shaanxi" (陝西三邊總督), with the headquarters at Guyuan. In 1653, the Viceroy's jurisdiction expanded to include Sichuan Province, hence the office was renamed "Viceroy of (Si)Chuan and the Three Borders in Shaanxi" (川陝三邊總督). In 1656, the office was renamed "Viceroy of (Si)Chuan-Shaan(xi)" (川陝總督) and its headquarters were relocated to Hanzhong. In 1661, the office changed its name to "Viceroy of Shaanxi" (陝西總督) after Sichuan was removed from its jurisdiction.

In 1666, during the reign of the Kangxi Emperor, the Viceroy's jurisdiction expanded to include Shanxi Province, hence it was renamed "Viceroy of Shan(xi)-Shaan(xi)" (山陝總督), with its headquarters in Xi'an. Shanxi was removed in 1672, and Sichuan was added again in 1680.

In 1723, the Yongzheng Emperor ordered that all Viceroys who also held the position of Secretary of War (兵部尚書) would concurrently be appointed as Right Censor-in-Chief (右都御史) of the Detection Branch (都察院) in the Censorate. Those Viceroys who did not hold the position of Secretary of War would be concurrently appointed as Right Vice Secretary of War (兵部右侍郎) and Right Vice Censor-in-Chief (右副都御史). In 1725, Yue Zhongqi (岳鍾琪) became the first Han Chinese outside of the Han Military Eight Banners to become a Viceroy when he was appointed as Viceroy of Chuan-Shaan. In 1731, the office was renamed "Viceroy of Shaanxi" (陝西總督) and its jurisdiction covered Shaanxi and Gansu; a separate Viceroy of Sichuan was created for Sichuan.

In 1736, the Qianlong Emperor abolished the Viceroy of Sichuan and recreated the office of Viceroy of Chuan-Shaan. In 1748, he split the Viceroy of Chuan-Shaan into Viceroy of Sichuan and Viceroy of Shaan-Gan, but reversed the changes again in 1759 and established a separate Viceroy of Gansu, with its headquarters in Suzhou (肅州; present-day Suzhou District, Jiuquan, Gansu). In 1760, the Qianlong Emperor abolished the Viceroy of Gansu and restored the two offices of Viceroy of Sichuan and Viceroy of Shaan-Gan. The Viceroy of Shaan-Gan was headquartered in Lanzhou and concurrently held the appointment of a Provincial Governor.

In 1882, during the reign of the Guangxu Emperor, the newly established Xinjiang Province was included under the jurisdiction of the Viceroy of Shaan-Gan.

List of Viceroys of Shaan-Gan

Ming dynasty

Qing dynasty

References

 

 
es:Virrey de Shaan-Gan